SLBC may refer to:

Sierra Leone Broadcasting Corporation
Sri Lanka Broadcasting Corporation
Srisailam Left Bank Canal